Aharonov is a surname. Notable people with the surname include:

 Dorit Aharonov (born 1970), Israeli computer scientist
 Yakir Aharonov (born 1932), Israeli physicist

See also 
 Aharonov–Bohm effect, quantum mechanical phenomenon
 Aharonov–Casher effect, quantum mechanical phenomenon